Kruseman is a surname. Notable people with the surname include:

Cornelis Kruseman (1797–1857), Dutch painter
Jan Adam Kruseman (1804–1862), Dutch painter
Jan Theodoor Kruseman (1835-1895), Dutch painter
Mina Kruseman (1839–1922), Dutch feminist
Cory Kruseman (born 1970), American race driver